Reda Hegazy (born 4 December 1959) is the current Egyptian Minister of Education and Technical Education in the cabinet headed by Mostafa Madbouly in succession of Tarek Shawki.

Before appointing, Hegazy had long held the position of deputy minister of education at the Ministry of Education.

References

External links 
 
 

1959 births
Living people
Mansoura University alumni
Education Ministers of Egypt
21st-century Egyptian politicians